Garville Netball Club is an Australian netball team based in Woodville, Adelaide, South Australia. Their senior team currently plays in the Netball South Australia Premier League. During the 1990s they played at a national level, representing Netball South Australia in the Mobil Superleague. During the Mobil Superleague era, they were also referred to as Adelaide Garville. In 1993 they were Mobil Superleague premiers.

History

Early years
Garville Netball Club was formed in 1952. Its name is derived from Woodville Gardens, the Adelaide suburb where the club was originally based. Between 1962 and 1967, Garville won six successive South Australia state league premierships.

Rivallry with Contax
During the 1980s and 1990s, Garville enjoyed a rivalry with Contax. Between 1986 and 1996 Contax and Garville contested every South Australia state league grand final. The rivalry saw the two clubs compete in nine consecutive state league grand finals, plus one Mobil Superleague final, with both clubs winning five finals each. Between 1992 and 1995 Garville won four successive state league grand finals.

National leagues
Mobil Superleague
During the 1990s Garville represented Netball South Australia in the Mobil Superleague, the winners of which were awarded the Prime Minister's Cup. Garville were grand finalists in both 1993 and 1994. In the 1993 grand final a Garville team featuring Natalie Avellino, Jenny Borlase and Michelle den Dekker defeated Sydney Electricity and finished as champions. However, in 1994 Garville lost the Prime Minister's Cup after they were defeated by Contax in controversial circumstances. A Contax team captained by Kathryn Harby and featuring Vicki Wilson and Tania Obst, took on a Garville team that again featured Avellino, Borlase and Dekker and now included Simone McKinnis. A closely fought match finished level at full time. However Garville claimed they had actually won the match 48–46. It was alleged that during the third quarter, the official scorer accidentally gave one of Garville's goals to Contax. Despite protests from Garville, extra time was played and resulted in a 61–58 win for Contax.

Commonwealth Bank Trophy 
In 1997 Netball Australia replaced the Mobil Superleague with the Commonwealth Bank Trophy league. Netball South Australia formed two brand new teams, Adelaide Thunderbirds and Adelaide Ravens to represent them in the new league. Garville effectively became a feeder team for Ravens.

Grand finals
South Australia state league

Mobil Superleague/Prime Minister's Cup

Home venues
Garville was originally based in the Woodville/Woodville Gardens suburbs. They later moved to the Sam Johnson Sportsground in Renown Park. After 2008 they hired courts near the Anzac Highway/Goodwood Road junction for its junior teams while it's senior teams trained at St Aloysius College  and played their state league games at the Netball SA Stadium.

Notable players

Internationals

 Samantha Poolman

 Carla Borrego 

 Lyn Fullston

Adelaide Thunderbirds
 Kelly Altmann
 Carla Borrego 
 Samantha Poolman
 Joanna Sutton
 Peta Squire

Head coaches

Premierships
Netball South Australia Premier League
Winners: 1962, 1963, 1964, 1965, 1966, 1967, 1971, 1974, 1987, 1989, 1992, 1993, 1994, 1995: 14
Runners up: 1970, 1988, 1990, 1991, 1996, 2014, 2018: 7 
Mobil Superleague
Winners: 1993
Runners up: 1994

References

External links
  Garville Netball Club on Facebook
  Garville Netball Club on Instagram

Sporting clubs in Adelaide
Netball teams in South Australia
Sports clubs established in 1952
1952 establishments in Australia
Esso/Mobil Superleague teams
South Australia state netball league teams